The Roman Catholic Diocese of Juigalpa (erected 21 July 1962, as the Territorial Prelature of Juigalpa) is a suffragan of the Archdiocese of Managua. It was elevated on 30 April 1991.

Ordinaries
Julián Luis Barni Spotti, O.F.M. (1962–1970), appointed Bishop of Matagalpa
Pablo Antonio Vega Mantilla (1970–1993)
Bernardo Hombach Lütkermeier (1995–2003), appointed Bishop of Granada
Sócrates René Sándigo Jiron (2004–2019), appointed Bishop of León en Nicaragua
Marcial Humberto Guzmán Saballo (2020–)

See also
Catholic Church in Nicaragua

References

External links
 

Juigalpa
Juigalpa
Juigalpa